Automobile was an American automobile magazine published by the Motor Trend Group. A group of former employees of Car and Driver led by David E. Davis founded Automobile in 1986 with support from Rupert Murdoch's News Corporation, using the credo No Boring Cars. Automobile distinguished itself as more of a lifestyle magazine than the other automotive publications, an editorial theme that Davis greatly expanded upon from his tenure as the editor of Car and Driver, though it was a sister publication to Motor Trend.

Unlike other automobile magazines, Automobile didn't often conduct instrumented tests of cars or provide much technical data. Instead, the reviews of vehicles were subjective experiential reports with the cars in their naturally intended, real world environment. Additionally, Automobile reserved a good portion of each issue for covering vehicles no longer in production, but still relevant to collectors or automotive history as a whole. For example, the magazine included features such as "Collectible Classic," an in-depth review of a particular older car, and reports from recent classic and antique car auctions. Automobile also had a regular column by former General Motors designer Robert Cumberford, who analyzed styling elements of current production models and show cars, often linking their design to those of older cars.

In December 2019, Motor Trend Group subsidiary TEN Publishing announced that it would discontinue publication of Automobile. Its final issue was dated February 2020.

Publishers 
 1986–1991: News Corporation
 1991–2007: Primedia
 2007–2014: Source Interlink Media
 2014–2017: TEN: The Enthusiast Network
 2017–2020: Motor Trend Group

Awards

Automobile of the Year
From 1990 to 2014, Automobile awarded their "Automobile of the Year" to one car annually.
1990: Mazda MX-5 Miata
1991: Acura NSX
1992: Cadillac Seville Touring Sedan
1993: Chrysler Concorde / Dodge Intrepid / Eagle Vision
1994: Dodge / Plymouth Neon
1995: BMW M3
1996: Honda Civic
1997: Toyota RAV4
1998: Porsche Boxster
1999: Volkswagen New Beetle
2000: Ford Focus
2001: Chevrolet Corvette Z06
2002: Subaru Impreza WRX
2003: Nissan 350Z
2004: Mitsubishi Lancer Evolution
2005: Chrysler 300C
2006: BMW 3-Series
2007: Volkswagen GTI
2008: Audi R8
2009: Nissan GT-R
2010: Volkswagen GTI
2011: Chevrolet Volt
2012: Audi A7
2013: Tesla Model S
2014: Chevrolet Corvette Stingray

Automobile All-Stars
In 2015, Automobile replaced their "Automobile of the Year" award with the "Automobile All-Stars", naming multiple cars on the list annually.
2015: Alfa Romeo 4C, BMW i8, BMW 2-Series, Chevrolet Camaro Z/28, Ford Mustang, Honda Fit, Lamborghini Huracán, Mercedes-Benz C-Class, Subaru WRX / WRX STI, Volkswagen Golf GTI
2016: Ferrari 488 GTB, Ford Mustang Shelby GT350, Mazda MX-5 Miata, McLaren 570S, Porsche Cayman GT4, Volkswagen Golf R, Volvo XC90
2017: Acura NSX, BMW M2, Chevrolet Bolt EV, Honda Civic Hatchback Sport, Porsche 718 Cayman S, Volvo S90
2018: Ford GT, Honda Accord Sport 2.0T, Honda Civic Type R, Lexus LC 500, McLaren 720S, Mercedes-AMG GT R, Porsche 911 Carrera GTS, Volvo V90 T6 AWD
2019: BMW M2 Competition, Ferrari 812 Superfast, Hyundai Veloster N, McLaren 600LT, Mercedes-Benz G550, Nissan Altima SR 2.0T, Porsche 911 GT2 RS
2020: Bentley Continental GT V8, Chevrolet Corvette Stingray, Ferrari F8 Tributo, Ford Mustang Shelby GT500, Kia Telluride, Mazda3 Hatchback, Porsche 911 Carrera S, Toyota GR Supra

Design of the Year

1990: Nissan 300ZX
1991: Acura NSX
1992: Honda Civic VX Hatchback
1993: Mazda RX-7
1994: Saab 900
1995: Ferrari 456
1996: Ford Taurus
1997: GM EV1
1998: Chrysler Concorde
1999: BMW M Coupe
2000: Audi TT
2001: Alfa Romeo 156 Sportwagon
2002: Mercedes-Benz SL-Class
2003: BMW Z4
2004: Toyota Prius
2005: BMW 6-Series
2006: Pontiac Solstice
2007: Aston Martin V8 Vantage
2008: Audi R8
2009: Audi A5
2010: Nissan Cube
2011: Jaguar XJ
2012: Fisker Karma
2013: Porsche Boxster
2014: BMW i8
2015: Mercedes-Benz S-Class Coupe
2016: Ford GT
2017: Volvo S90
2018: Tesla Model 3
2019: BMW 8-Series
2020: Porsche Taycan

References

External links
 

Motor Trend Group
1986 establishments in Michigan
2020 disestablishments in California
Automobile magazines published in the United States
Defunct magazines published in the United States
Magazines established in 1986
Magazines disestablished in 2020
Magazines published in Los Angeles
Magazines published in Michigan
Mass media in Ann Arbor, Michigan
Monthly magazines published in the United States